
Gmina Niedźwiedź is a rural gmina (administrative district) in Limanowa County, Lesser Poland Voivodeship, in southern Poland.

Villages
Gmina Niedźwiedź contains the villages and settlements of Konina, Niedźwiedź, Podobin, and Poręba Wielka.

Neighbouring gminas
Gmina Niedźwiedź is bordered by the town of Mszana Dolna and by the gminas of Kamienica, Mszana Dolna, Nowy Targ,and Rabka-Zdrój.

References
 Polish official population figures 2006

Niedzwiedz
Limanowa County